Bertil Matérn (18 May 1917 – 6 November 2007) was a Swedish statistician. The Matérn covariance function is named after him.

Life and work 

Bertil Matérn was born on 18 May 1917 in Gothenburg, Sweden, to Ernst Matérn, a pharmacist, and Hedvig Rhedin. He studied at Stockholm University, under the supervision of Harald Cramér.
 He was employed at the Forestry Research Institute of Sweden, where he worked on forestry statistics.

Matérn married Carin Berglund in 1947. They had two daughters, Barbro and Gunhild. Matérn died on 6 November 2007 in Danderyd.

References 

1917 births
2007 deaths
Swedish statisticians
20th-century Swedish mathematicians
Stockholm University alumni
Spatial statisticians
Mathematical statisticians
People from Gothenburg